The Coppa Ottorino Barassi (also called Italian-English Amateur League Cup) is a defunct amateur association football competition named after Ottorino Barassi that was contested from 1968 until 1976. The competition was contested by the English FA Amateur Cup winners and the Italian Coppa Italia Dilettanti winners and was played over two-legs, one at each participating club's stadium. Leytonstone F.C. were the first champions of the competition in 1968, winning on the away goals rule following a 1–1 draw in the first leg at home, and a 2–2 in the return away fixture. The following year the cup was shared after both legs finished 2–0 to the home team. The 1974 tournament was not played, and following the abolition of the FA Amateur Cup that year the English representative became the champions of the Second Division of the Isthmian League. The last instalment of the competition was in 1976, when Unione Sportiva Soresinese won following a penalty shootout. This was the only time an Italian team won the competition.

Matches

Key

Results

References

Defunct international club association football competitions in Europe
Defunct football competitions in England
Defunct football competitions in Italy